Cinema therapy or movie therapy is a form of expressive therapy – like art, music and dance therapy – for medical and mental health issues. It is also used as a form of self-help. Cinema therapy was created and popularized by Dr. Gary Solomon, the first to write on using movies as therapy.

The movement started to catch up again in 2019 with the featured documentary "Calypsonians" by director Anghelo Taylor, unlike the creation of Dr. Gary Solomon, Anghelo Taylor wrote the CinemaTherapy Manifesto, that starts with one simple principle: "In order for cinema therapy truly exist the filmmaker must have an internal search, question or problem to solve inside himself but that relates with the rest of humanity or with specific community. Once the filmmaker and his crew engage in the process of filmmaking, they start healing by the revelation and situations that happen along the process of making a film. In the end, the result of that process will be a medicine for all the viewers as human beings. But everything starts with the deep intention that the filmmaker has when making the film"

Following this, in 2020 a YouTube channel called "Cinema Therapy" emerged and reached 1m subscribers on 11 August 2022. The channel produces episodes around 30-40 minutes long where a filmmaker and therapist, Alan Seawright and Jonathan Decker respectively, provide examples of using cinema therapy in practice.

Definition
Cinema therapy is defined by Segen's Medical Dictionary as:
A form of therapy or self-help that uses movies, particularly videos, as therapeutic tools. Cinema therapy can be a catalyst for healing and growth for those who are open to learning how movies affect people and to watching certain films with conscious awareness. Cinema therapy allows one to use the effect of imagery, plot, music, etc. in films on the psyche for insight, inspiration, emotional release or relief and natural change. Used as part of psychotherapy, cinema therapy is an innovative method based on traditional therapeutic principles.

There are several types of cinema therapy, with varying degrees of entertainment and therapeutic value. Popcorn cinema therapy is primarily cinema entertainment, that may result in an emotional release. Evocative cinema therapy, helps individuals connect with story lines and the movie characters. In the process they "learn about themselves in more profound ways." Cathartic cinema therapy helps a person access their emotions, for instance if they are in a depression, and may be used early stage in psychotherapy.

Overview
Cinema therapy is the use of cinema or movies to manage medical, mental health, and life management. It has been used as a form of self-help and to aid in inmate rehabilitation. Cinema therapy has been said by its proponents to change individual's thoughts, feelings and ability to manage life events. Movies are used in some prisons to help individuals understand what led them to commit and be convicted of crimes.

After viewing the movie, it is recommended to assess one's reaction to the movie, such as: What did you like or not like about the movie? Who did you find to be attractive and unattractive characters? Was there someone in the film that you'd like to be more like?

Like art, music and dance therapy, cinema therapy is supplemental means of therapy to be used within traditional therapy, according to Dr. Bruce Skalarew, a psychoanalyst and psychiatrist. He is also co-chair of the Forum for Psychoanalytic Study of Film.

Cinematherapy (one word) as a form of self-help for women using a variety of movies was popularized by the humorous series by Nancy Peske and Beverly West. Cinematherapy inspired a wraparound television show of the same name on Romance Classics (later Women's Entertainment).

Films or movies
Examples of cinema therapy categories and movies are:

Other categories include coping with prejudice, childhood trauma, eating disorders, suicide, family issues and relationships, loss, psychological thriller, and gay and lesbian relationships.

Clinical outcomes
Beyond the entertainment value of leaving isolated hospital wards to view films, it is increasingly believed that patient's recovery is improved by viewing "feel-good" films, or ones that make the patient laugh.

Adams and McGuire (1986) found that elderly residents living in a long-term care facility reported feeling less pain after watching humorous movies and required less non-scheduled medication than the control group who watched a nonhumorous movie. However, Adams and McGuire did not discuss whether or not participants took part in additional therapies as a part of their daily routine. It is possible that additional therapies may have contributed to the decrease in pain and in effect would threaten the internal validity of the study had they not controlled for the additional therapies.

Dumtrache (2014) conducted a study that explored the use of cinematherapy in a group setting and its effectiveness on diminishing anxiety in young people. She found a significant drop in anxiety between those in the control group and those in the cinematherapy group. The methodology, however, raises questions regarding the study's validity. The sample was chosen based on a cluster sample of students who expressed their desire to take part in a development group focusing on movies – making it a pseudorandom sample. The fact that students expressed their desire to take part in such therapy may have affected the outcome.

Gary Solomon, PhD, MPH, MSW, and author of The Motion Picture Prescription and Reel Therapy states that viewing television or film movies "can have a positive effect on most people except those [with] psychotic disorders."

A study conducted by Eg ̆eci & Gencöz, concluded that watching the movies alone does not induce insight and change. There are however insight-inducing effects when a therapeutic session is held afterwards, allowing for the participant to “[deepen] the perceived connections between the movies and the participants’ relationship problems enable them to pass through the stages theoretically expected to induce change” (2017). These findings seem to suggest that simply watching certain movies identified to help with various issues does not in fact produce therapeutic change. However, holding in-depth therapy sessions following, may help to facilitate insight via emotional connection and identification to certain aspects of the movie, which gives the therapist a chance to probe and promote emotional/behavioural change.

Programs

MediCinema
MediCinema is a UK-based registered charity that places cinemas in hospital buildings and screens films for patients, caregivers and family members during the patient's hospital stay. The first installation was the St Thomas' Hospital in London in 1999. It allows individuals to leave what can be isolating rooms and wards for a period of entertainment.

Another of the other complexes is at Defence Medical Rehabilitation Centre at Headley Court. The Health and Welfare Director at the Royal British Legion, Sue Freeth, stated "Rehabilitation is not only a huge physical challenge, but involves recuperating mentally as well. This excellent new facility will assist our brave Service personnel in doing just that."

Chicago Institute for the Moving Image 
Chicago Institute for the Moving Image (CIMI) uses creation of films as a means for therapy for individuals in therapeutic care with depression, amnesia, schizophrenia and other psychiatric illnesses.  Writing, producing and directing movies "provides a certain amount of therapy, organization, and order that people with psychological diseases need, and it helps the therapist see what the conflicts are within their patients lives," said CIMI's executive director, Joshua Flanders. The result provides a view of the filmmaker's world and has resulted in "enormous breakthroughs".

Film/video-based therapy 
Joshua Lee Cohen, author and co-editor of Video and Filmmaking as Psychotherapy: Research and Practice (published by Routledge in 2015), helped to establish a collaborative effort in forming film/video-based therapy. This form of therapy is about making films with clients, as opposed to cinema therapy which is about watching films. Dr. Cohen also hosted a seminar for Dr. Solomon at Colorado College in 1997. Dr. Cohen was inspired by Dr. Solomon's work to build on the concept of cinematherapy. Dr. Cohen began searching for ways to make films for therapeutic purposes and eventually sought out others who used film/video as a part of psychotherapy. He then wrote his dissertation on the subject and eventually published an academic book mentioned above.

Perception Enneagram Mirror Neurons 
The Center for Studies of Psychology of Art and Expressive Psychotherapy has been studying for years the benefits of Psycofilm method, combining Psychology, Sensory analysis, Enneagram (C. Naranjo) and Mirror Neurons (G. Rizzolatti), with poetry, art and writing. Since the past 10 years the center has been hosting an event dedicated to the Venice Film Festival and the Rome Festival. Enriched by the viewpoint of experts from different and complementary fields, this special event let us explore the international filmography as an exciting journey. The main texts had seen the contribution of several audiovisual arts experts, like Agiscuola. CONSCOM, MiBACT, intellectuals, academics and critics of international figures, including Giorgio Pressburger, Roberto Barzanti, Juan Octavio Prenz, Graham Cairns, Maciej Stasiowskj, Ernesto G. Laura, Alberto Fasulo, Maurizio Lozzi, Catello Masullo. They all outline the Psycofilm method and they report the beneficial effects of the Psycofilm on Alzheimer's patients and cancer patients. The event also seek to promote culture - and the culture is good. The last of the lyrics from the title "Nostoi Ritorni Cinema Comunicazione Neuroni Specchio" edited by Paola Dei Editions Altravista Preface of Nicola Borrelli" has been proclaimed one of the best essays of 2015 in the Albo d'Oro.

Il Metodo Psycofilm Perception Enneagram Mirror Neurons 

An innovative method that uses cinema for prevention and rehabilitation, conceived by Paola Dei, with the participation of the Center for Studies of Psychology of Art and Expressive Psychotherapies, has been validated by experiments through scientific tests and published in international scientific magazines. The Method makes use of the principles of Rudolf Arnheim's Psychology of Art, the discovery of mirror neurons by Giacomo Ruzzolatti and his team and Claudio Naranjio's theory of personality. Expert at the oncology department of Campostaggia - Azienda USL Toscana Sud Est, oncology department directed by Dr. Angelo Martignetti, with the collaboration of the Valdelsa Donna Association, the method has shown how through a filmic path lasting one year, the stress level in the participants of 50/60%. Partly experienced also with Alzheimer's patients at ASP city of Siena, he has produced a book entitled: Le favole dei nonni. Giving a voice to Alzheimer's with art therapy

References

Further reading

Clinical intervention

Other
 Dei Paola (2008) Eros Thanatos e cibo al Lido. Dalla Psicologia dell'Arte alla Cinematografia Prefazione di Roberto Barzanti Edizioni MEF 
 Dei Paola (2009) Figli al cinema. prevenire il bullismo......Prefazione di R. Barzanti, G. Napoli, G. Ippoliti Edizioni Zona 
 Dei Paola Gregorio Napoli: (2910) Lanterna magica. Cineterapia e poesia al Lido fra sogni e bisogno. Prefazione di G. Blandini Edizioni Boocksprint 
 Dei Paola ( a cura di) (2011) Neuroni specchio. Cinematerapia del lutto fra Venezia Roma e Walt Disney Prefazione di N. Borrelli Edizioni Scientifiche STILL 
 Dei Paola ( a cura di) (2012) Il potere al cinema. Dall'architettura del Lido all'Auditorium di Renzo Piano Prefazione di N. Borrelli Edizioni Scientifiche STILL 
 Dei Paola ( a cura di) (2013) MMelato forever with Pupi Avati, Massimo Ranieri, Oriella Dorella, Massimo Ghini, Lina Wertmuller, Franca Valeri, Giancarlo Giannini, Callisto Cosulich, Maurizio Porro Prefazione N. Borrelli Edizioni Falsopiano 
 Dei Paola (a cura di) (2014) Nostoi Ritorni Cinema Comunicazione Neuroni Specchio Edizioni Altravista Prefazione di N. Borrelli 
 Dei Paola ( a cura di) (2015) Il male al cinema Movies Shadows and Lights Prefazione di N. Borrelli 
 Dei Paola ( a cura di) Ettore Scola e dintorni Edizioni Falsopiano Prefazione di N. Borrelli 
 Dei Paola (a cura di) Bulli ed eroi nella filmografia di Caligari e Mainetti Efesto Edizioni 
 Dei Paola (a cura di) (2018) Le forme della violenza. Cinema e dintorni .Edizioni Efesto Roma
 Dei Paola (a cura di) (2019) I cannibali. Questioni di famiglia nel cinema nell’arte nella letteratura Edizioni Efesto Roma
 Dei Paola (2020) Cinema e psico-oncologia. Il Metodo Psycofilm in Phenomena Journal Rivista  Internazionale di Psicopatologia Neuroscienze Psicoterapia

Self-help
 
 
 
 
 
 

Creative arts therapies